Brachodes nana is a moth of the family Brachodidae. It is found in Albania, Croatia, North Macedonia, Greece and on Sicily.

References

Moths described in 1834
Brachodidae
Moths of Europe